The Österreichische Basketball Bundesliga (ÖBL) Finals MVP is the award, given to the best player in the ÖBL Finals, the finals of the highest professional basketball league in Austria. The award was handed out for the first time in 2006.

Winners

References

Finals Mvp
European basketball awards
Basketball most valuable player awards